Poopó is a Bolivian town, capital of the province of Poopó, in the department of Oruro.

References

External links 

Populated places in Oruro Department